Glacis is an administrative district of Seychelles located in the North Region of the island of Mahé. It also encompasses uninhabited Mamelles Island 13 kilometers to the northeast of Mahé, and the tiny Brisan Rocks in between.

Glacis District has an area of 7 km². Between the censuses of 2002 and 2010, the population rose from 3.576 to 3.833.

References

Districts of Seychelles
Mahé, Seychelles